Gastón Carrillo de Peralta y Bosquete, 3rd Marquess of Falces (Spanish: Don Gastón Carrillo  de Peralta, III marqués de Falces) (1510–1587) was a Spanish nobleman who was the third viceroy of the Viceroyalty of New Spain (colonial México) from October 16, 1566 to March 10, 1568.

Biography
He was born in Pau, Navarre (now in France).

Gastón de Peralta was appointed viceroy of New Spain in 1566, replacing Francisco Ceinos and the Audiencia Real of Mexico, which had been governing on an interim basis since the death of the previous viceroy, Luís de Velasco.

After the death of Velasco, a conspiracy to obtain independence from Spain was discovered. Some personalities of high position, including some close relatives of Hernán Cortés — Martín, Don Martín Cortés y de Zuñiga,  and Luís (his sons, and half-brothers of each other) — were involved in this plot. It was made known to Peralta while he was still at the coast in Veracruz, before he entered Mexico City to take up his office officially. A local judge of the Audiencia Real of México had sentenced the conspirators to death, but Peralta personally reviewed the cases of each of the prisoners and suspended the death penalty for Luís and Martín Cortés. They were sent back to Spain to be dealt with by the Council of the Indies.

Peralta arrived in Mexico City  in a tense atmosphere. One of his first acts was to remove the artillery and soldiers that had been posted at the viceroy's palace and in the principle streets of the city. His leniency toward the conspirators alarmed the Audiencia, which accused him of sympathizing with the rebels and protecting them. Testimony was given that the new viceroy had a list of 30,000 rebel fighters ready to rise against the Crown. These accusations were communicated to Spanish king Philip II in a letter. Alarmed, King Philip dispatched two visitadores, Luis Carrillo and Lic. Alonso Muñoz, to New Spain to investigate the charges. They ordered Peralta back to Spain to explain his conduct.

In his brief term of office, Peralta founded a hospital for the aged, invalids, convalescents, and the "insane."

Back in Spain, he was tried and acquitted. Subsequently, he was made constable of Navarre. He died in Valladolid in 1587.

See also
Francisco Ceinos

References

Viceroys of New Spain
1510 births
1587 deaths
Falces
1560s in New Spain